Milton Reed (October 1, 1848 –  September 18, 1932) was an American  journalist, attorney and politician who served as Mayor of Fall River, Massachusetts.

Reed studied law at Harvard law school, and in the office of Edmund H. Bennett.

See also
 102nd Massachusetts General Court (1881)

Notes

1848 births
1932 deaths
Harvard Law School alumni
Politicians from Haverhill, Massachusetts
Mayors of Fall River, Massachusetts
Massachusetts state senators